Paul Fadiala Keita (born 23 June 1992) is a Senegalese footballer who plays as a defensive midfielder for Belgian club URSL Visé.

Club career
Keita began his professional career with Greek Football League side PAS Giannina in 2010, having previously played for the youth sides of Senegal Premier League side AS Douanes and Primeira Liga side S.L. Benfica. His professional début for PAS Giannina came in a 3–1 victory over Pierikos on 11 October 2010. He became a regular player for PAS Giannina that year, and went on to make a total of 29 appearances for the club as they were promoted to the Superleague. However, his appearances became limited over the next three seasons; although he made 24 appearances during the 2012–13 season, only nine of these were starts. After making nine appearances during the 2013–14 season, Keita switched to Superleague side Kalloni, and made twelve appearances for his new club before the end of the season. On 16 January 2016, Keita signed a two and a half years' contract with Atromitos for an undisclosed fee.

Kaita signed for Kerkyra on 31 January 2017 but was released on 3 March 2017.

On 23 July 2021, he signed a two-year contract with the third-tier Belgian National Division 1 club URSL Visé.

Career statistics

References

External links
 

1992 births
Footballers from Dakar
Living people
Association football midfielders
Senegalese footballers
Senegal youth international footballers
PAS Giannina F.C. players
AEL Kalloni F.C. players
Atromitos F.C. players
PAE Kerkyra players
Mezőkövesdi SE footballers
S.K. Beveren players
Akhisarspor footballers
URSL Visé players
Super League Greece players
Football League (Greece) players
Nemzeti Bajnokság I players
Belgian Pro League players
TFF First League players
Senegalese expatriate footballers
Expatriate footballers in Greece
Senegalese expatriate sportspeople in Greece
Expatriate footballers in Hungary
Senegalese expatriate sportspeople in Hungary
Expatriate footballers in Belgium
Senegalese expatriate sportspeople in Belgium
Expatriate footballers in Turkey
Senegalese expatriate sportspeople in Turkey